The Bergheider See, south of Finsterwalde near Lichterfeld in the county of Elbe-Elster in Germany, is a flooded pit from the former open cast mine of Klettwitz-Nord, northeast of the Lower Lusatian Heath. The lake was named after the old village of Bergheide, which had to be abandoned for the brown coal pit.

The flooding of the pit, under the direction of the LMBV company in charge of dealing with the consequences of lignite mining, began in September 2001 and ended in May 2014. On the Lichterfeld shore (north shore) are bathing facilities. The other shores have been designated as Nature Preserves. There are also restricted areas belonging to the LMBV (Lausitzer Mitteldeutsche Bergbau Verwaltungsgesellschaft = Lusatian Central German Mining Administration Company).

In 2002, the F60 Visitor Mine opened on the northern shore of the lake. It has been made accessible for visitors. Together with the show mine, the lake is being converted into a recreation area with floating houses, a water sports centre and a holiday home park. The terrain is being used to stage events. The starting project for the scheme was the International Construction Exhibition of Prince Pückler Land from 2000 to 2010.

The newly renovated Landstraße L 60 from Lichterfeld to Lauchhammer, which runs past the Bergheider See, was closed in summer 2010 but reopened in December 2015.

References

External links 

 Pressemitteilung der Lausitzer und Mitteldeutsche Bergbau-Verwaltungsgesellschaft mbH (LMBV) zum Beginn der Flutung des Bergheider Sees (21. September 2001)
 Website of the show mine

Artificial lakes of Germany
Surface mines in Germany
Former mines in Germany
Lakes of Brandenburg
Geography of Lusatia
Elbe-Elster
Elbe-Elster Land